Ramashankar Yadav (3 December 1957 – 8 December 2015), also known as Vidrohi, was an Indian poet and social activist who went to Jawaharlal Nehru University (JNU) as a student but continued to live on or around its campus well beyond his student life.

Always present during student protests, reciting his revolutionary poetry at such occasions, and otherwise at Ganga Dhaba, was a common sight. He died participating in a student protest in Delhi. He was a progressive poet with reformative spirit. He tried to sensitise the society at large against religious superstition, gender discrimination and economic inequality in society through his poems. He was vocal against state repression, persecution of marginalised section of society and crackdown on voice of dissenting opinion. A documentary  Main tumhara Kavi Hoon has been published on his life and work on 20 September 2015, almost three months before his death.

Biography
Vidrohi was born in Sultanpur, Uttar Pradesh, India, to Ramnarayan Yadav and Karma Devi.
He was studying for his LLB in a college in U.P. where he was rusticated due to his involvement in student politics. He came to New Delhi and got enrolled as a PhD candidate in the Hindi department of the Jawaharlal Nehru University, where once again, he was rusticated for similar reasons.

He is known, and not only by JNU regulars, for his poetry, people's poetry, but also a lot for the lifestyle he had chosen - a life devoid of almost any material possession, his clothes, in most cases bought by others, being the only exception - the trees of JNU, the corners of its hostels, the benches of its dhabas and the office of its student union his only abode.

He did not seek money, fame or power. He did not even write down his poems. He just recited them. Whatever work of his we see in written form is the result of the efforts of his admirers.

References

External links

 web|url=https://homegrown.co.in/amp/article/800220/the-void-left-by-jnu-s-rebel-poet-ramashankar-vidrohi-yadav |title= 'मैं तुम्हारा कवि हूँ'

1957 births
2015 deaths
Activists from Uttar Pradesh
20th-century Indian poets
Indian male poets
Oral poets
Poets from Uttar Pradesh
20th-century Indian male writers